This List of Professional Bull Riders Champions provides lists of all the world champion title winners, including one livestock award which are won during the PBR World Finals event in Las Vegas, Nevada. There are the World Champion bull riders, World Finals event champions, World Champion Bulls, and Rookie of the Year, for example. Also listed are the winners of various awards that are given out at the PBR World Finals. The Professional Bull Riders, Inc. (PBR) is an international professional bull riding organization based in Pueblo, Colorado, United States. In the U.S., PBR events have been televised on CBS and CBS Sports Network since 2012, streamed on the PBR RidePass channel on Pluto TV since 2021, and steamed on Paramount+ plus since 2022. More than 500 cowboys from the United States, Canada, Mexico, Brazil, Australia and other countries hold PBR memberships. This article lists all the various champions and awards that have been bestowed since the founding of the PBR in 1992.

World Champion Bull Riders
 2022   Daylon Swearingen
 2021   Jose Vitor Leme
2020    Jose Vitor Leme
2019    Jess Lockwood 
2018    Kaique Pacheco
2017    Jess Lockwood
2016    Cooper Davis
2015    J.B. Mauney
2014    Silvano Alves   
2013    J.B. Mauney
2012    Silvano Alves
2011    Silvano Alves
2010    Renato Nunes
2009    Kody Lostroh
2008 	 Guilherme Marchi
2007 	 Justin McBride
2006 	 Adriano Moraes
2005 	 Justin McBride
2004 	 Mike Lee
2003 	 Chris Shivers
2002 	 Ednei Caminhas
2001 	 Adriano Moraes
2000 	 Chris Shivers
1999 	 Cody Hart
1998 	 Troy Dunn
1997 	 Michael Gaffney
1996 	 Owen Washburn
1995 	 Tuff Hedeman 
1994 	 Adriano Moraes
Source:

World Finals Event Champions
2022  Daylon Swearingen
2021  Jose Vitor Leme
2020  Boudreaux Campbell
2019  Jess Lockwood
2018  Marco Eguchi
2017  Jose Vitor Leme
2016  Ryan Dirteater
2015  Cooper Davis
2014  Silvano Alves
2013  J.B. Mauney
2012  Robson Palermo
2011  Robson Palermo
2010  Renato Nunes
2009  J.B. Mauney
2008  Robson Palermo
2007  Wiley Petersen
2006  L.J. Jenkins
2005  Guilherme Marchi
2004  Mike Lee
2003  Jody Newberry
2002  J.W. Hart
2001  Luke Snyder
2000  Tater Porter
1999  Ty Murray 
1998  Reed Corder
1997  Troy Dunn
1996  Ronnie Kitchens
1995  Troy Dunn
1994  Ted Nuce 
Source:

Rookie of the Year
2022  Bob Mitchell
2021  Eli Vastbinder
2020  Boudreaux Campbell 
2019  Dalton Kasel
2018  Keyshawn Whitehorse
2017  Jose Vitor Leme
2016  Jess Lockwood 
2015  Kaique Pacheco
2014  J. W. Harris 
2013  João Ricardo Vieira
2012  Emilio Resende
2011  Rubens Barbosa
2010  Silvano Alves
2009  Cody Nance
2008  Reese Cates
2007  Clayton Williams
2006  J.B. Mauney
2005  Kody Lostroh
2004  Zack Brown
2003  Jody Newberry
2002  Dan Henricks
2001  Luke Snyder
2000  Jason Bennett
1999  Mike White 
1998  Pete Hessman
1997  Keith Adams
1996  Ronnie Kitchens
1995  J.W. Hart
Source:

World Champion Bull
2022 – Ridin’ Solo
2021 – Woopaa
2020 – Smooth Operator
2019 – Smooth Operator
2018 – Sweet Pro's Bruiser
2017 – Sweet Pro's Bruiser
2016 – Sweet Pro's Bruiser • and ••
2015 – Sweet Pro's Long John
2014 – Bushwacker
2013 – Bushwacker
2012 – Asteroid
2011 – Bushwacker
2010 – Bones
2009 – Code Blue
2008 – Bones
2007 – Chicken on a Chain
2006 – Mossy Oak Mudslinger
2005 – Big Bucks
2004 – Little Yellow Jacket
2003 – Little Yellow Jacket
2002 – Little Yellow Jacket
2001 – Dillinger
2000 – Dillinger
1999 – Promise Land
1998 – Moody Blues
1997 – Panhandle Slim
1996 – Baby Face
1995 – Bodacious
Source:

• Bodacious was also the 1994–1995 PRCA Bucking Bull of the Year. Now that Sweet Pro's Bruiser has won the PRCA Bucking Bull of the Year award for 2017, he and Bodacious are the only bulls to win both the PRCA and PBR titles. Each bull won their two titles in the same year. Bodacious won both of his titles in 1995, while Sweet Pro's Bruiser won both of his titles in 2017.

•• There was actually a tie between Sweet Pro's Bruiser, Sweet Pro's Long John and Pearl Harbor, which was resolved by taking the sum of the bull's best eight outs for the season. That is done according to the PBR rules as the first way to resolve a tiebreaker.

Bull of the World Finals
 2022 – Night Hawk
 2021 – Woopaa
 2020 – Smooth Operator (tie)
 2020 – I'm Busted (tie)
 2019 – Smooth Operator
 2018 – Legit (tie)
 2018 – Hocus Pocus (tie)
 2017 – Sweet Pro's Bruiser
 2016 – No bull awarded
 2015 – No bull awarded
 2014 – No bull awarded
 2013 – Bushwacker
 2012 – Asteroid
 2011 – Bushwacker
 2010 – Bones
 2009 – Code Blue
 2008 – Bones
 2007 – Troubadour (tie)
 2007 – Chicken on a Chain (tie)
 2006 – Lucky Strike
 2005 – Pandora's Box
 2004 – Crossfire Hurricane
 2003 – Neon Nights
 2002 – Ugly
 2001 – Little Yellow Jacket
 2000 – Promise Land 
 1999 – Promise Land (tie)
 1999 - Dillinger (tie)
 1998 – Cash
 1997 – Nitro
 1996 – Strawberry Wine
Source:

Touring Pro Division Champions  
2022  Daylon Swearingen
2021  Daylon Swearingen
2020  Jose Vitor Leme
2019  Jess Lockwood
2018  Andrew Alvidrez
2017  Ezekiel Mitchell
2016  Cody Nance
2015  Luis Blanco
2014  Jason Malone
2013  Chase Outlaw
2012  Edevaldo Ferreira
2011  Shane Proctor 
2010  Douglas Duncan
2009  J.B. Mauney  
2008  Clayton Williams 
2007  Clayton Williams 
2006  J.B. Mauney
2005  Edgard Oliveira 
2004  Ross Johnson 
2003  Adriano Moraes
2002  Adriano Moraes 
2001  Paulo Crimber 
2000  Chris Shivers
1999  Jason Bennett
1998  Brian Herman
1997  Chris Shivers
1996  Troy Dunn
1995  Tuff Hedeman
Source:

Note: This tour debuted in 1995 as the Touring Pro Division, and was known by such name until 2001, when it was renamed as the Challenger Tour. In 2010, it was changed back to its original title of the Touring Pro Division.

Velocity Tour Champions
2022  Clayton Sellars
2021  Adriano Salgado
2020  Mason Taylor
2019  Jose Vitor Leme
2018  Alisson de Souza
2017  Alex Marcilio
2016  Chase Outlaw
2015  Gage Gay
2014  Jason Malone
Source:

Challenger Series Champions
2022  Keyshawn Whitehorse

International Champions

Canada
2022  Nick Tetz
2021  Cody Coverchuk
2020  Dakota Buttar
2019  Daylon Swearingen 
2018  Cody Coverchuk
2017  Zane Lambert
2016  Ty Pozzobon
2015  Tanner Byrne
2014  Stetson Lawrence
2013  Zane Lambert
2012  Aaron Roy
2011  Tyler Thomson
2010  Aaron Roy
2009  Beau Hill 
2008  Aaron Roy
2007  Tyler Pankewicz 
2006  Scott Schiffner
Source:

Mexico
2022 – No PBR Mexico events for a third year in a row. 
2021 – No PBR Mexico events this year due to continued COVID-19 restrictions.
2020 – No PBR Mexico events this year due to COVID-19 restrictions. 
2019  Francisco García Torres
2018  Francisco García Torres
2017  Francisco Morales
2016  Juan Carlos Contreras
2015  Alejandro Gamboa  
2014  Gustavo Pedrero
2013  Gustavo Pedrero
2012  Juan Carlos Contreras
2011  Simao da Silva
2010  Adrian Ferreiro 
2009  Jason O’Hearn
2008 – No PBR Mexico events this year.
2007  Hugo Pedrero
2006  Mario Galindo
Source:

Note: All PBR Mexico events in the 2009 season took place in San Antonio, Texas, United States.

Brazil
2022  Cássio Dias 
2021 – Only one PBR Brazil event this year. It was closed to the public due to continuity of COVID-19 restrictions.
2020 – No PBR Brazil events this year due to COVID-19 restrictions.
2019  Alan de Souza
2018  Fernando Henrique Novais
2017  Jose Vitor Leme
2016  Dener Barbosa
2015  Luciano Henrique de Castro
2014  Tiago Vitor
2013  Claudio Crisostomo
2012  Edevaldo Ferreira
2011  Edevaldo Ferreira
2010  Elton Cide
2009  Thiago Paguioto
2008  Edmundo Gomes 
2007  João Mauro Kugel
2006  Elton Jose de Souza
Source:

Australia
2022  Cody Heffernan
2021  Aaron Kleier
2020  Aaron Kleier 
2019  Aaron Kleier
2018  Aaron Kleier
2017  Troy Wilkinson
2016  Cody Heffernan
2015  Fraser Babbington 
2014  David Kennedy
2013  Chris Lowe
2012  David Kennedy
2011  Kevin "Jock" Connolly
2010  David Kennedy
2009  David Kennedy
2008  Pete Farley
2007  Ben Jones
2006  Tim Wilson
Source:

World Cup Champions 
Discontinued after 2010. 
 2010  Team Brazil
 2009  Team USA
 2008  Team USA
 2007  Team Brazil
Source:

Global Cup Champions 
2022  Team USA Eagles
2021 – No Global Cup event this year due to different COVID-19 protocols between the five PBR countries. 
 2020  Team USA Eagles
 2019  Team Brazil
 2018  Team Brazil
 2017  Team USA

Australia Origin Series Champions
2022  Team Queensland
2021  Team Queensland
2020 – No Origin Series events this year due to COVID-19 restrictions.
2019  Team Queensland

U.S. Team Series Champions
2022  Nashville Stampede

U.S. Team Series MVP
 2022  Jose Vitor Leme (Team:  Austin Gamblers)

U.S. Team Series Fan Favorite Bull
 2022 – Moonlight Party

Other awards
The PBR has some secondary awards, in addition to the World Championship, given out annually, some named after bull riders fatally injured during competition.

The Rookie of the Year award goes to the rookie (first full year of Premier Series competition) bull rider who wins the most points of all first-year competitors.

The Stock Contractor of the Year award goes to the stock contractor who has supplied the best bulls to Premier Series events. This award is given based on a vote among bull riders.

The Bull of the World Finals award goes to the bull who scores the highest points combining all his outs during the PBR World Finals.

The Lane Frost/Brent Thurman Award is for the highest-scoring single ride at the World Finals. It is named for Lane Frost, the 1987 Professional Rodeo Cowboys Association (PRCA) World Champion bull rider who was fatally injured at the Cheyenne Frontier Days rodeo on July 30, 1989, and Brent Thurman, a rising star in pro bull riding and co-founder of the PBR who was seriously injured at the National Finals Rodeo in Las Vegas on December 11, 1994 and died six days later.

The Glen Keeley Award is for the Canadian bull rider who earns the most points throughout the entire Premier Series season. It is named for Glen Keeley, the 1989 Canadian Professional Rodeo Association (CPRA) champion bull rider who died of injuries sustained at  the PBR Bud Light Cup Series’ Ty Murray Invitational on March 24, 2000 in Albuquerque, New Mexico.

The Mason Lowe Award is for the highest-scoring single ride during the regular season of the Premier Series. Mason Lowe was an American bull rider who died of his injuries after being stepped on by a bull on January 15, 2019, during a PBR Velocity Tour event held in conjunction with the National Western Stock Show in Denver, Colorado.

The Golden Barrel Awards recipients are decided by fans who voted online. The categories are based on moments that occurred during the Premier Series  regular season. The Best Celebration award is for the rider who gave the best celebration after completing a successful qualified ride, the Best Winning Ride award is for the rider who gave the best ride of the regular season, the Best Save award is for the bullfighter who put out the best save of a rider from a bull, the 7 Seconds of Agony award is for the rider who gave the best seven-second ride, and the Best Breakthrough Performance award is for the rider who gave the best performance by winning a UTB event after recently going through some professional setbacks. The final category was added in 2022.

The Team Series MVP is awarded to the individual rider who earned the most points during the regular season of the PBR’s U.S. Team Series. 

The Team Series Fan Favorite Bull is awarded to the best performing bull during the regular season of the PBR’s U.S. Team Series and is decided by fans who voted online. 

The PBR also has recognition awards in the Heroes and Legends Celebration. Some of these like the Ring of Honor and the Brand of Honor are the equivalent of a Hall of Fame recognition. From 2019 to 2020, the Mason Lowe Award was presented in the arena during the PBR World Finals, but it became a part of the Heroes and Legends Celebration in 2021. However, by 2022, it was  now awarded during the opening gala the day before the beginning of the PBR World Finals. From 2011 to 2019, and again in 2021, the Heroes and Legends Celebration took place just before the start of the PBR World Finals. However, as of 2022, said ceremony is no longer a part of the PBR World Finals. Beginning in 2023, it will be held at the National Cowboy & Western Heritage Museum in September during the week of Freedom Fest, the annual PBR Team Series event in Oklahoma City, Oklahoma.

Stock Contractor of the Year
 2022 – Chad Berger, Clay Struve and D&H Cattle Company
 2021 – Chad Berger and Clay Struve
 2020 – Chad Berger and Clay Struve 
 2019 – Chad Berger and Clay Struve 
 2018 – Chad Berger and Clay Struve 
 2017 – Chad Berger and Clay Struve
 2016 – Chad Berger and Clay Struve 
 2015 – Chad Berger and Clay Struve 
 2014 – Chad Berger and Clay Struve 
 2013 – Jeff Robinson Bucking Bulls
 2012 – Jeff Robinson Bucking Bulls
 2011 – Jeff Robinson Bucking Bulls
 2010 – Jeff Robinson Bucking Bulls
 2009 – Chad Berger and Clay Struve 
 2008 – Chad Berger and Clay Struve
 2007 – Chad Berger and Larry Ryken
 2006 – Page & Teague Bucking Bulls
 2005 – D&H Cattle Company
 2004 – D&H Cattle Company
 2003 – D&H Cattle Company
 2002 – D&H Cattle Company
 2001 – D&H Cattle Company
 2000 – Herrington Cattle Company
 1999 – Terry Williams Bucking Bulls
 1998 – Terry Williams Bucking Bulls
 1997 – Terry Williams Bucking Bulls
 1996 – Terry Williams Bucking Bulls
 1995 – Terry Williams Bucking Bulls
Source:

Lane Frost/Brent Thurman Award recipients 
 2022  Mauricio Moreira (94.25 points on Jive Turkey)
 2021  Jose Vitor Leme (98.75 points on Woopaa)
 2020  Jose Vitor Leme (95.75 points on Woopaa)
 2019  Rubens Barbosa (95.75 points on Chiseled) 
 2018  Marco Eguchi (94 points on Spotted Demon) 
 2017  Jose Vitor Leme (94.5 points on Magic Train)
 2016  Cooper Davis (91 points on Catfish John) 
 2015  J.B. Mauney (92.75 points on Bruiser)
 2014  J.B. Mauney (94 points on Percolator) 
 2013  J.B. Mauney (93.75 points on Smackdown)
 2012  Austin Meier (90.75 points on Shepherd Hills Trapper)  [tie]
 2012  Chris Shivers (90.75 on Shepherd Hills Sod Buster) [tie]
 2011  Robson Palermo (93.25 points on King of Hearts) 
 2010  Valdiron de Oliveira (91.5 points on Spit Fire) 
 2009  J.B. Mauney (93.75 points on Black Pearl)
 2008  J.B. Mauney (93.75 points on Crosswired)
 2007  J.B. Mauney (92.75 points on Copperhead Slinger)
 2006  Adriano Moraes (93 points on Here’s Your Sign) [tie]
 2006  Dustin Hall (93 points on Here’s Your Sign) [tie]
 2005  Cody Whitney (94.75 points on Little Yellow Jacket)
 2004  Mike Lee (93.75 points on Mossy Oak Mudslinger) [tie]
 2004  Michael Gaffney (93.75 points on Little Yellow Jacket) [tie] 
 2003  Jody Newberry (94.5 points on Little Yellow Jacket)
 2002  Cory McFadden (95 points on Little Yellow Jacket)
 2001  Chris Shivers (96.5 points on Dillinger)
 2000  Ednei Caminhas (94.5 points on Dillinger)
 1999  Terry Don West (96 points on Promise Land) [tie]
 1999  Chris Shivers (96 points on Trick or Treat) [tie]   
 1998  Cody Custer (95.5 points on Red Wolf) 
 1997  Troy Dunn (95 points on Red Wolf)
 1996  Adriano Moraes (93.5 points on Shotgun Red)
Source:

Glen Keeley Award recipients
 2022 – Griffin Smeltzer 
 2021 – Dakota Buttar
 2020 – Dakota Buttar
 2019 – Dakota Buttar
 2018 – Dakota Buttar
 2017 – Dakota Buttar
 2016 – Tanner Byrne
 2015 – Tanner Byrne
 2014 – Tanner Byrne
 2013 – Aaron Roy
 2012 – Chad Besplug
 2011 – Aaron Roy
 2010 – Aaron Roy
 2009 – Aaron Roy
 2008 – Aaron Roy
 2007 – Scott Schiffner
 2006 – Jesse Torkelson
 2005 – Matt Roy
 2004 – Rob Bell
 2003 – Rob Bell
 2002 – Reuben Geleynse
 2001 – B.J. Kramps
 2000 – B.J. Kramps
Source:

Mason Lowe Award recipients
 2022  Jose Vitor Leme (94.75 points on Ridin’ Solo)
 2021  Jose Vitor Leme (97.75 points on Woopaa)
 2020  Jose Vitor Leme (94.25 points on Smooth Operator)  
 2019  Jess Lockwood (94 points on Heartbreak Kid)

Tough Guy Award recipients
 2022  João Ricardo Vieira
 2021  Jose Vitor Leme

Golden Barrel Awards recipients
2022
 Best Celebration:  Stetson Lawrence
 Best Winning Ride:  João Ricardo Vieira
 Best Save:  Frank Newsom
 7 Seconds of Agony:  Daylon Swearingen
 Best Breakthrough Performance:  Daylon Swearingen 
 
2021
 Best Celebration:  Ezekiel Mitchell
 Best Winning Ride:  Jose Vitor Leme
 Best Save:  Cody Webster
 7 Seconds of Agony:  Keyshawn Whitehorse

Tiffany Davis Friend of the West Award recipients
 2022  Matt West

U.S. Team Series General Manager of the Year

 2022  Tina Battock (Team:  Nashville Stampede)

U.S. Team Series Coach of the Year
 2022  Justin McBride (Team:  Nashville Stampede)

High Money Bull of the Regular Season 
Awarded to the bull who earned the most money for the bull riders in the regular season. Discontinued after 2013.
 2013 – Prince Albert
 2012 – Bad Moon
 2011 – Gunpowder & Lead
 2010 – Segs The Juice
 2009 – Fully Loaded
 2008 – Cat Man Do
 2007 – Evil Forces
 2006 – Chief
 2005 – Mossy Oak Mudslinger
 2004 – Bo Howdy
 2003 – Maximus
 2002 – Promise Land
 2001 – Promise Land
 2000 – Moody Blues
 1999 – Gusto
 1998 – Promise Land
 1997 – Shotgun Red
 1996 – High Voltage
 1995 – Baby Face
Source:

Heroes and Legends Celebration

This article presents a list of major champions and honors won by Professional Bull Riders. The Heroes and Legends Celebrations have their own article which lists the Ring of Honor, Sharon Shoulders Award, Jim Shoulders Lifetime Achievement Award, Brand of Honor, and Ty Murray Top Hand Award.

See also
 American Bucking Bull
 Bull Riders Only
 Bull Riding Hall of Fame
 Championship Bull Riding
 International Professional Rodeo Association
 Lists of rodeo performers
 PBR Global Cup
 PBR World Cup
 Professional Rodeo Cowboys Association
 ProRodeo Hall of Fame

References

Bibliography

External links 
 Official sites of Professional Bull Riders, Inc.:
 Official Site
 Canada
 Australia
 Mexico 
 Brazil 

Organizations established in 1992
Rodeo organizations
Organizations based in Colorado
Sports in Pueblo, Colorado
Professional Bull Riders
Rodeo in the United States
Bucking bulls
Rodeo competition series
Sports in Las Vegas
Champions
Professional bull riders
Bull riders
Lists of sports awards